Hindu temples are built in the Panchayatana layout: the main shrine is surrounded by four subsidiary shrines. The origin of the name are the Sanskrit words Pancha (five) et ayatana (containing).

Generally, Hindu temples are built along a west-east axis. So the four subsidiary shrines are at the north-east, south-east, south-west, north-west.

Examples of Panchayatana temples
 Kandariya Mahadeva Temple in Khajuraho
 Brahmeswara Temple in Bhubaneswar
 Jagdish Temple in Udaipur
 Lakshmana Temple in Khajuraho
 Lingaraja Temple in Bhubaneswar
 Arasavalli Temple near Srikakulam District of Andhra Pradesh near Visakhapatnam. Main shrine dedicated to Aditya. Subsidiary shrines dedicated to Ganesh, Shiva, Parvati and Vishnu.
 Dashavatara Temple in Deogarh, Uttar Pradesh. It should be the oldest panchayatana temple in India.
 Nabaratna Temple in Pantchupi
 Shiva Panchayatana Temple in Tumbadi, Tumkur district. Subsidiary shrines dedicated to Lakshmi Narasimha, Vinayaka, Parvati and Surya.
 Gondeshvara temple, in Sinnar, Maharashtra
Panchayatan temple at Dronasagar, Kashipur, Uttarakhand is an archeological site,  from 6th century AD.

Notes

External links
 http://templenet.com/Andhra/arasavalli.html

Architectural elements
Hindu temple architecture